Matías Hernán Mayedonchi (前鈍内マティアスエルナン, born 18 February 1989) is an Argentina-born Japanese futsal player who plays for Shriker Osaka. He made his first appearance at Japan national futsal team in a friendly game vs Croatia in 2014.

Titles 
 All Japan Futsal Championship (3)
 2013, 2014, 2015
 F.League Ocean Cup (3)
 2012, 2013, 2014

References

External links 
 

1989 births
Living people
Argentine people of Japanese descent
Sportspeople of Japanese descent
Argentine emigrants to Japan
Japanese men's futsal players
Nagoya Oceans players